Genādijs Soloņicins (born 3 January 1980 in Liepāja) is a retired Latvian football midfielder. His last professional club was Liepājas Metalurgs in the Latvian Higher League, the club where he spent most of his professional career. Soloņicins was also a member of Latvia national football team.

Club career

Soloņicins played for Liepājas Metalurgs for 12 years, making his debut in 1997. In the penultimate match of the 2004 Virslīga season he missed a crucial last minute penalty in a 3–2 loss to Skonto FC meaning the club lost out to Skonto on becoming Latvian champions. However, the following season, Soloņicins was part of the Liepājas Metalurgs team that finally broke Skonto's 14-year reign in Latvian football when they became Virslīga champions in October 2005. In December, he was named the Virslīgas best Midfielder of the 2005 season. In summer 2009 he joined Simurq Zaqatala playing in the Azerbaijan Premier League. While playing in Azerbaijan he became a substantial first eleven figure and helped the club start the 2009–2010 season unexpectedly well but the end of the season was not as good and Simurq finished the regular championship in the 7th position. At the time teams in Azerbaijan were divided into 2 pools after the end of the regular season with 6 teams in each pool. As Simurq finished 7th, they competed in the second pool with the last 6 teams of the regular season. Due to the relatively poor results Simurq broke off contracts with its foreign players and Soloņicins was forced to leave the club in February 2010.

Following the release, Soloņicins signed a contract with Liepājas Metalurgs in March 2010, returning to the team, where he had played before for nearly 13 years. At the end of 2010 he terminated his contract with Metalurgs to look for a club abroad, but having struggled with receiving satisfactory offers from other clubs returned to Metalurgs in February 2011, after being out of football for half a year. After the 2013 season Metalurgs football club was dissolved due to the financial struggle of its sole sponsor Liepājas Metalurgs, the metalwork company and replaced in the league by the newly formed FK Liepāja. In January 2014 Soloņicins announced his retirement from professional football.

International career
Soloņicins made 44 appearances for Latvia and scored 1 goal, playing for the national team from 2000 to 2010.

Honours
 Virslīga champion (2): 2005, 2009
 Virslīga runner-up (8): 1998, 1999, 2003, 2004, 2006, 2007, 2008, 2011
 Latvian Cup winner (1): 2006
 Baltic League champion (1): 2007

References

External links

1980 births
Living people
Sportspeople from Liepāja
Latvian footballers
FK Liepājas Metalurgs players
Simurq PIK players
Latvia international footballers
Latvian expatriate footballers
Expatriate footballers in Azerbaijan
Latvian expatriate sportspeople in Azerbaijan
Association football midfielders